Elkhart Township is one of twenty-four townships in Bates County, Missouri, and is part of the Kansas City metropolitan area within the USA.  As of the 2000 census, its population was 304.

History
Elkhart Township was established in the 1860s. The name is a transfer from  Elkhart, Indiana.

Geography
According to the United States Census Bureau, Elkhart Township covers an area of 35.54 square miles (92.05 square kilometers); of this, 35.45 square miles (91.83 square kilometers, 99.76 percent) is land and 0.09 square miles (0.22 square kilometers, 0.24 percent) is water.

Adjacent townships
 East Boone Township (north)
 Deer Creek Township (northeast)
 Mound Township (east)
 Mount Pleasant Township (southeast)
 Charlotte Township (south)
 Homer Township (southwest)
 West Point Township (west)
 West Boone Township (northwest)

Cemeteries
The township contains these two cemeteries: Howell and Scott.

School districts
 Adrian County R-III
 Butler R-V School District
 Miami R-I

Political districts
 Missouri's 4th congressional district
 State House District 125
 State Senate District 31

References
 United States Census Bureau 2008 TIGER/Line Shapefiles
 United States Board on Geographic Names (GNIS)
 United States National Atlas

External links
 US-Counties.com
 City-Data.com

Townships in Bates County, Missouri
Townships in Missouri